The Esso Research Centre was a research centre in Oxfordshire.

History
The site was Esso's main European technical centre for fuels and lubricants. The site was extended in 1957. Operations ceased in the early 2000s.

Structure
The site had the staff of Esso Research, with around 500 scientists and engineers.

Function
It conducted research into chemistry.

Location
It was situated on the western side of the A4130 (the original A34 trunk route) on Milton Hill, above Steventon, Oxfordshire. On disposal the site was split in two, between the headquarters of Infineum and the Milton Hill Business and Technology Centre. By 2018 the site had been cleared.

External links
Photos of pump/water tower in 2018 and 2013.

References

Engineering research institutes
Earth science research institutes
History of the petroleum industry in the United Kingdom
Petroleum organizations
Research institutes in Oxfordshire
Vale of White Horse
Energy research institutes
2000s disestablishments in England
ExxonMobil buildings and structures